Sportco was an Australian manufacturer of rifles and shotguns in Adelaide, South Australia, from 1947 until the early 1980s. Founded by Jack Warne, also known by its full name Sporting Arms Limited, began by manufacturing single shot 22LR rifles.   Sportco purchased ex military Martini Cadet rifles from the Australian Government and converted them to both rimfire and centrefire calibres as well as rebarrelling Lee–Enfield rifles to .303/22 and .303/25.

Soon they began producing their own designs of bolt action and 'Sportomatic' semi-automatic rifles as well as single shot shotguns followed by semi-automatic shotguns and pump-action rifles. They also started to export to Great Britain, Rhodesia, Borneo, South Africa, Canada, New Zealand and the United States of America.

Sportco supplied the British military with a blow-back action self-loading training rifle with a ten-round capacity. Sold in Australia as the Model 71S the British dubbed it Rifle,L29A2. An example is to be found in the Enfield Pattern Room collection. Sportco also supplied Winchester with actions for their Model 320 10 shot bolt action repeater and Model 310 single shot.

Sportco also sold ammunition under its own brand name that was manufactured by Riverbrand and Winchester Australia.

Their longest lasting model was the Model 44 target rifle which would later would be known as the Omark Model 44 and would be produced by MAB Engineering when Sportco would close its doors.

Sportco was sold to Omark Industries and shut its doors in the early 1980s.

Jack Warne would later leave Australia for the United States and found  
Kimber of Oregon.

Models
Caliber .22 l.r.
Sportco Martini
Sportco 2A semi automatic box magazine
Sportco 10A bolt action box magazine
Sportco 15 bolt action tube magazine
Sportco 40 bolt action single shot
Sportco 43 bolt action single shot
Sportco 46 bolt action single shot
Sportco 50
Sportco 61 bolt action box magazine
Sportco 62 bolt action box magazine
Sportco 62A bolt action box magazine deluxe
Sportco 62S bolt action box magazine
Sportco 63 bolt action box magazine
Sportco 63A bolt action box magazine deluxe
Sportco 63B bolt action box magazine
Sportco 64B bolt action box magazine
Sportco 66D bolt action box magazine deluxe
Sportco 66S bolt action box magazine
Sportco 71A semi automatic box magazine deluxe
Sportco 71S semi automatic box magazine
Sportco 72A semi automatic tube magazine
Sportco 73 semi automatic box magazine
Sportco 73A semi automatic box magazine deluxe
Sportco 73B semi automatic box magazine
Sportco 74 semi automatic box magazine
Sportco 87A semi automatic tube magazine
Sportco 90 pump action box magazine
Sportco 90A pump action box magazine
Sportco 90S pump action box magazine
Sportco 93 pump action box magazine
Sportco 93A pump action box magazine deluxe
Sportco 93B pump action box magazine
Sportco 93S pump action box magazine
Sportco carbine semi automatic box magazine
Sportco Martini Clubmaster single shot target rifle
Winchester 320 bolt action box magazine

Calibre .22 Hornet, .222 Remington, .222 Rimmed
Sportco Hornet bolt action box magazine
Sportco 33S bolt action box magazine
Sportco 33 bolt action box magazine deluxe
Sportco Martini

Shotguns
Sportco 54 single shot
Sportco 55 single shot
Sportco 80 single shot
Sportco 81 bolt action box magazine
Sportco 83 bolt action box magazine
Sportco 88 semi automatic 
Sportco 103 type 1 semi automatic
Sportco 103 type 2 semi automatic chromed barrel
Sportco 103 type 3 semi automatic deluxe
Sportco 103 type 4 semi automatic deluxe chromed barrel
Sportco 103 type 5 semi automatic 30" barrel

7.62mm Target Rifles
Sportco Model 44 bolt action single shot

See also

List of South Australian manufacturing businesses

References

External links

 UK NRA Historic Arms Resource Centre

Firearm manufacturers of Australia
Defunct firearms manufacturers
Australian companies established in 1947
Manufacturing companies based in Adelaide
Defunct manufacturing companies of Australia